The surname Nevin has several origins.

Etymology

In some cases, Nevin derived from the Irish Mac Cnáimhín, meaning "son of Cnámhín". In other cases, the surname is derived from the Irish Ó Cnáimhín, meaning "descendant of Cnámhín". The personal name Cnámhín, meaning "little bone", from the Irish cnámh ("bone"), is derived from a byname referring to a thin man.

In other cases, Nevin is derived from the Irish and Scottish Gaelic Mac Naoimhín, a patronymic form of a personal name derived from a diminutive of naomh ("holy, saint"). The surname Nevin can also be derived from the Scottish Gaelic Naomhín, meaning "little saint", commonly Latinised as Nevinus.

Early bearers of forms of the surname Mac Cnáimhín include: Aithius mac Mic Cnaimhín, in 1159; Donell oge McCnauyne, and Donell begg McCnavin, in 1583; and Dorghan Macknavin, in 1585. Early bearers of forms of the surname Ó Cnáimhín include: Cornelius O'Knavin, in 1574; and Owen O'Knavine, in 1601. Early bearers of forms of the surname Mac Naoimhín include: Thomas filius Neuini, in 1295; Thomas Maknevin, in 1528; Thomas Nevin, in 1538.

One particular family that has borne the surname Mac Cnáimhín was a literary and medical kindred of Uí Maine, first recorded in 1159. Whilst the surname Mac Cnáimhín is associated with Galway, the surname Mac Naoimhín is associated with Leinster, and Argyll, and the surname Ó Cnáimhín is associated with Munster.

In 1881, in Britain, the surname Nevin was most common in Lancashire. In 1847–1864, in Ireland, the surname Nevin was most common in Galway. Between John Joe Nevin, David Nevin, Luke Nevin, Timothy Nevin, Daniel Nevin and others, there have been bare-knuckle boxers called Nevin among the traveler community since Victorian times.

Notable people with the surname Nevin

 Arthur Nevin (1871–1943), American composer
 Blanche Nevin (1841–1925), American artist and poet
 Bob Nevin (born 1938), Canadian hockey player
 Brooke Nevin (born 1982), Canadian actress
 Edwin Nevin (1814–1889), American educator
 Ethelbert Nevin (1862–1901), American pianist and composer
 George Balch Nevin (1859–1933), American composer and businessman
 George Niven (1929–2008), Scottish football player 
 Gordon Balch Nevin (1892–1943), American musician
 John Niven, Scottish writer
 Johnny Nevin, Irish football player and hurler
 John Joe Nevin (born 1988), Irish boxer
 John Williamson Nevin (1803–1886), American theologian and educationalist
 Kate Nevin (died 1715), Scotswoman burnt as a witch
 Liam Nevin (born 1951), Irish writer
 Pat Nevin (born 1963), Scottish football player
 Phil Nevin (born 1971), American baseball player
 Robyn Nevin (born 1942), Australian actress
 Shannon Nevin (born 1976), Australian rugby football player
 Thomas Edwin Nevin (1906–1986), Irish physicist and academic
 Tom Nevin (1916–1972), Australian rugby player
 Tyler Nevin (born 1997), American baseball player

Notes

Citations

References

Anglicised Irish-language surnames
Anglicised Scottish Gaelic-language surnames
Irish families
Scottish surnames
Surnames of Irish origin
Surnames of Scottish origin